Robert Anthony Karnes (June 19, 1917 – December 4, 1979) was an American film, stage and television actor.

Life and career 
Karnes was born in Kentucky. He served in World War II, where he had interest into acting and going to Hollywood, California, when World War II ended. He began his film and television career in 1946, as appearing in the film The Bamboo Blonde, where he played the uncredited role of a Nightclub Patron. Karnes also began his stage career, where he appeared in the play Hamlet.

Later in his career, Karnes appeared in numerous television programs including Gunsmoke, Bonanza, Cheyenne, The Twilight Zone, The Waltons, The Rockford Files, M*A*S*H, The Streets of San Francisco, Alfred Hitchcock Presents, Emergency!, Perry Mason, The Andy Griffith Show, The Fugitive, The Untouchables, Mission: Impossible and Ironside, among others. He also starred, co-starred and appeared in films such as Miracle on 34th Street, Trapped, Gentleman's Agreement, Three Husbands, According to Mrs. Hoyle, Half Human, Scudda Hoo! Scudda Hay!, Road House, When My Baby Smiles at Me, Hills of Oklahoma, Stagecoach to Fury, Inside the Walls of Folsom Prison, From Here to Eternity and Fear No More. In 1959, Karnes played the role of Max Fields in the crime drama television series The Lawless Years, in which he co-starred with James Gregory.

In his stage career, Karnes played a lead role in the play John Loves Mary in San Francisco, California. He later left the cast, in which Karnes played the uncredited role of "Sgt. Turp Thornhill" in the 1953 film From Here to Eternity. His final credit was from the television film Bogie.

 Death 
Karnes died in December 1979 of heart failure at his home in Sherman Oaks, California, at the age of 62.

 Filmography 
 From Here to Eternity (1953) - Sgt. Turp Thornhill (uncredited)

 Tora! Tora! Tora! (1970) - Maj. John H. Dillon - Knox's Aide (uncredited)
 Glass Houses (1972)
 Executive Action (1973) - Man at Rifle Range
 Gable and Lombard (1976) - Gable's Director
 The Domino Principle (1977) - Lefty (uncredited)
 Billy Jack Goes to Washington'' (1977) - Bailey Associate

References

External links 

Rotten Tomatoes profile

1917 births
1979 deaths
People from Kentucky
Male actors from Kentucky
American male film actors
American male stage actors
American male television actors
20th-century American male actors
Western (genre) television actors
Male Western (genre) film actors